Ellam Unakkaga is a 1961 Indian Tamil-language drama film directed by Adurthi Subba Rao from a story by Aatreya. The film stars Sivaji Ganesan and Savitri. It was released on 1 July 1961, and failed commercially.

Plot 

Anandan and Venkatachalam are friends. Venkatachalam's daughter Sarala, following an accident, loses her ability to walk. A doctor informs Venkatachalam that he treated a similarly handicapped woman, who in the process of giving birth to a child, was cured and could walk again. Inspired, Venkatachalam marries off Sarala to Anandan, deciding that if Sarala is not cured within two years, the marriage will dissolve and Anandan can marry any other woman he wants. Anandan and Sarala live a happily married life. Sarala gives birth to a child, but is not cured of her handicap. However, Anandan refuses to abandon hope. The rest of the film revolves around what happens to the many problems of the characters.

Cast 
 Sivaji Ganesan as Anandan
 Savitri as Sarala
 S. V. Ranga Rao as Venkatachalam
 T. S. Balaiah as Egambaram
 T. R. Ramachandran
 V. Nagayya
 M. S. Sundari Bai
 C. K. Saraswathi as Anandan's mother

Production 
Ellam Unakkaga was directed by Adurthi Subba Rao from a story by Aatreya. The film was produced by Saravanabhava Unity Pictures, filmed by P. Ramasamy and edited by K. Govindasamy. Shooting took place at the Adyar-based Neptune Studios, later known as Sathya Studios.

Soundtrack 
The music of the film was composed by K. V. Mahadevan, assisted by Pugazhendi. The lyricists were Kannadasan, A. Maruthakasi, Thanjai N. Ramaiah Dass, Ku. Ma. Krishnan and Kothamangalam Subbu.

Release and reception 
Ellam Unakkaga was released on 1 July 1961. Kanthan of Kalki said the film could be seen once for Savitri. According to historian Randor Guy, the film was not a commercial success as viewers reacted negatively to seeing Ganesan and Savitri as lovers onscreen, the duo having acted as siblings in Pasamalar earlier that year.

References

External links 
 

1960s Tamil-language films
1961 drama films
1961 films
Films directed by Adurthi Subba Rao
Films scored by K. V. Mahadevan
Films with screenplays by K. S. Gopalakrishnan
Indian drama films